Arthur Preston may refer to:

 Arthur Edwin Preston (1852–1942), mayor of Abingdon-on-Thames, antiquarian and historian
 Arthur Preston (bishop) (1883–1936), third Bishop of Woolwich
 Arthur Murray Preston (1913–1968), United States Navy officer and Medal of Honor recipient in World War II
 Arthur Preston (priest) (1761–1844), Anglican priest in Ireland